MATTE is an acronym for Major Accident to the Environment. The term is used in EU  major accident prevention legislation, the so-called Seveso II Directive. Further guidance and the definition of MATTE is available in "Guidance on the Interpretation of Major Accident to the Environment for the Purposes of the COMAH Regulations" Department of the Environment, Transport and the Regions - June 1999".

References

Environmental law
Acronyms